Naimo may refer to:

People
 Charlie Naimo, American association football coach
 Lee Naimo, member of the Australian musical comedy act The Axis of Awesome
 Rosario Naimo (born 1945), member of the Sicilian mafia

Automobiles
 Kia Naimo, a 2011 South Korean subcompact crossover concept